Sodium/bile acid cotransporter 7 is a protein which in humans is encoded by the SLC10A7 gene.

See also

References

Further reading

Solute carrier family